Group A of the 2001 Copa América was one of the three groups of competing nations in the 2001 Copa América. It comprised  Colombia, Chile, Ecuador, and Venezuela. Group play ran from 11 to 17 July 2001.

Colombia won the group and faced Peru, the second-best third-placed finishers, in the quarter-finals. Chile finished second and faced Mexico—the runners-up of Group B—in the quarter-finals. Ecuador and Venezuela finished third and fourth in the group, respectively, and were eliminated from the tournament.

Standings

All times are in local, Colombia Time (UTC−05:00).

Matches

Ecuador vs Chile

Colombia vs Venezuela

Chile vs Venezuela

Colombia vs Ecuador

Ecuador vs Venezuela

Colombia vs Chile

External links
Copa América 2001 at RSSSF

Group A
2001 in Ecuadorian football
2001 in Colombian football
Chile at the 2001 Copa América
Venezuela at the 2001 Copa América